Aviation Club de France was a gambling club in central Paris, France.

The club opened in 1907 and was widely regarded as a classic gambling site.
In 2005, the Grand Prix de Paris leg of the World Poker Tour took place at the Aviation Club.

The main games played at the Aviation Club were: baccarat, poker and backgammon.

The club was closed in 2014, after a raid by the police, and placed in liquidation in February 2015.

References

1907 establishments in France
2014 disestablishments in France
Casinos completed in 1907
Defunct casinos
Casinos in France
Entertainment venues in Paris
Former buildings and structures in Paris